Hannah Lee (also known as Outlaw Territory and Hannah Lee: An American Primitive) is a 1953 American Western film directed by Lee Garmes and John Ireland.  It was originally filmed in stereoscopic 3-D Pathécolor using the twin-Camerette 3-D system by Stereo-Cine Corp.

Based on the novel "Wicked Water" by MacKinlay Kantor.

Plot
Bus Crow (Macdonald Carey), a professional gunfighter from Texas, arrives in Pearl City looking for work. After slapping around a boy who offers to watch his horse and shooting someone over a small slight at the local saloon, he makes quite an impression on the locals. This leads to his being hired by powerful ranchers to convince squatters to leave the area. U.S. Marshal Sam Rochelle (John Ireland) is brought in to investigate subsequent murders and immediately suspects Crow.

Cast
 Joanne Dru, as Hannah
 Macdonald Carey, as Crow
 John Ireland, as Marshal Rochelle
 Frank Ferguson, as John Britton
 Tom Powers, as the town sheriff

External links
 
 
 http://www.screeninsults.com/outlaw-territory.php
 http://forum.westernmovies.fr/viewtopic.php?t=8573

1953 films
1953 Western (genre) films
American 3D films
1953 3D films
American Western (genre) films
Films based on works by MacKinlay Kantor
Films scored by Paul Dunlap
Squatting in film
Revisionist Western (genre) films
1950s English-language films
Films directed by John Ireland
1950s American films